The 1999 CFL Draft took place on Tuesday, April 13, 1999. 46 Canadian football players were chosen from eligible players from Canadian universities as well as Canadian players playing in the NCAA. Of the 46 draft selections, 28 players were drafted from Canadian Interuniversity Athletics Union institutions.

Trades
In the explanations below, (D) denotes trades that took place during the draft, while (PD) indicates trades completed pre-draft. This is a partial list due to references being limited.

Round one
 Toronto → Montreal (PD). Toronto traded a first-round selection to Montreal in exchange for Nigel Williams.
 Saskatchewan → Toronto (PD). Saskatchewan traded a first-round selection to Toronto in a trade for Andrew Stewart.

Round two
 Hamilton → Winnipeg (PD). Hamilton traded a second-round selection to Winnipeg in a trade for Franco Rocca.
 Winnipeg → Edmonton (PD). Winnipeg traded a second-round selection to Edmonton in a trade for Shalon Baker.
 Winnipeg → BC (PD). Winnipeg traded a second-round selection to BC in a trade for Mike Trevathan.
 Edmonton → Montreal (PD). Edmonton traded a second-round selection to Montreal in a trade for Dwayne Provo.

Round four
 Winnipeg → Montreal (PD). Winnipeg traded a fourth-round selection to Montreal in a trade for Tom Monios.

Forfeitures
 Toronto forfeited their sixth-round selection after selecting Noel Prefontaine in the 1998 Supplemental Draft.

Draft order

Round one

Round two

Round three

Round four

Round five

Round six

References 

Canadian College Draft
Cfl Draft, 1999
1999 in Canadian football